NOP or N.O.P. may refer to:

 NOP (code), an assembly language instruction etc. that effectively does nothing at all
 3-Nitrooxypropanol, an enzyme inhibitor
 "Narodnooslobodilački pokret", also known as the Croatian Partisans
 National Opinion Polls, a pollster acquired by GfK
 National Organic Program, an American organic food certification program
 National Revival of Poland (Narodowe Odrodzenie Polski), a nationalistic Polish political party
 Network of practice in social science
 New Orleans Pelicans, a National Basketball Association team based in the U.S. city of New Orleans, Louisiana
 New Orleans Protocol, a 2004 agreement among white supremacist and neo-Nazi groups
 Nike Oregon Project, an athletics team
 Nociceptin receptor, a neurotransmitter receptor in the opioid receptor family
 Northern Ontario Party, a political party in Ontario, Canada
 North Point station, a train station on the Hong Kong MTR Island Line
 Sinop Airport (IATA code NOP), an airport in Sinop, in the Black Sea Region of Turkey

See also
 Noop (disambiguation)